Visano is a comune in the province of Brescia, in Lombardy, Italy. It encompasses approximately 11 square kilometres and is the home to about 2,000 people. It borders on the communes of Acquafredda, Calvisano, Isorella and Remedello.

References

Cities and towns in Lombardy